Turun Kisa-Veikot (TuKV for short) is a sports club from Turku, Finland. The club was founded in the then-independent municipality, Maaria, area where they still operate and own a club house. It was established in 1930 as Maarian Kisa-Veikot. Football was played since the formation of the club, other sections include futsal, ice hockey, roller hockey, badminton and capoeira, they also run amateur theatre. The club is a member of the Finnish Workers' Sports Federation, abbreviated as TUL.

Football
Football was part of clubs sports since foundation. They played in Finnish workers sports federation first level in 1938, 1939 and 1940 seasons. In 1943-44 Season they were qualified to Mestaruussarja but withdrew together with other TUL club Tampereen Pallo-Veikot before last round, this was the first season when Finnish FA and TUL clubs played in the same premiership. After WWII they played in the second level of TUL Leagues and were qualified for 1948 mestaruussarja. Between 1950 and 1953 they played in TUL competitions and when lower levels were also unified with Finnish FA in 1954 they started from third tier Maakuntasarja. In 2019 season their first team plays in sixth tier, Vitonen.

Season to Season

1 season in Mestaruussarja
4 seasons in Suomensarja
11 seasons in Maakuntasarja
6 seasons in Kolmonen
15 seasons in Nelonen
17 seasons in Vitonen
1 season in Kutonen

References

External links
 Official site
Finnish Wikipedia

Sports clubs in Finland
Football clubs in Finland
Sport in Turku
1930 establishments in Finland